Dewey Dupree McDonald (born June 10, 1990) is a former American football linebacker. He played college football at California University of Pennsylvania, and signed with the Indianapolis Colts as an undrafted free agent following the 2014 NFL draft. He has also been a member of the New England Patriots, Oakland Raiders, and Seattle Seahawks.

High school career
McDonald was a three-time all-conference player, three-time all-area and two-time team MVP while playing at Jefferson High School in Shenandoah Junction, West Virginia. As a junior, he was named Defensive Player of the Year by The Journal. The newspaper also named him Male Field Athlete of the Year in his senior year, during which he was part of the high school's state championship in track and field.

College career
McDonald transferred to California University in 2012 after playing three seasons at Fairmont State University in Fairmont, West Virginia. After missing the 2012 season due to injury, he was a senior captain for the Vulcans in 2013. In his senior year, he recorded 89 tackles and returned all three of his interceptions for touchdowns. His three interception returns for touchdowns made him the first Pennsylvania State Athletic Conference player to accomplish the feat in over 10 years.

Professional career

Indianapolis Colts
McDonald signed with the Indianapolis Colts as an undrafted free agent after the 2014 NFL Draft. After starting the 2014 season on the team's practice squad, he was signed to the active roster on September 29. He appeared in 12 games during his rookie season, recording 10 tackles, including 8 solo. He also appeared in three playoff games for the team that season, recording one tackle in each.

On September 5, 2015, McDonald was waived by the Colts. He was added to the practice squad the following day. He was elevated to the active roster on October 20. He appeared in one game and recorded one tackle.

On October 27, 2015, McDonald was waived by the Colts to make room on the active roster for Quan Bray.

New England Patriots
On October 28, 2015, McDonald was claimed off waivers by the New England Patriots. He played one game with the Patriots before being waived on November 12. He was signed to the team's practice squad on November 14, but was released four days later.

The Patriots signed McDonald to the active roster on November 26, 2015, after placing Aaron Dobson on injured reserve. On November 28, 2015, he was waived once more.

Oakland Raiders
On December 2, 2015, McDonald was signed to the Oakland Raiders practice squad. On December 29, he was elevated to the active roster for the team's final game of the season after fullback Marcel Reece was suspended.

Seattle Seahawks
On September 3, 2016, McDonald was traded to the Seattle Seahawks in exchange for a conditional pick in the 2017 NFL Draft. The Seahawks converted McDonald from a safety to a linebacker. He played in 14 regular-season games in the 2016 season, recording 8 tackles (6 solo), along with two playoff games.

On September 27, 2017, McDonald was placed on injured reserve after suffering an ACL injury in Week 3.

Career statistics

Regular season

Postseason

Personal life
In 2015, McDonald started a foundation to help his youth Jefferson County, West Virginia. He started his own flag football league, called the Dewey League, and charity softball tournament.

References

1990 births
Living people
People from Jefferson County, West Virginia
Players of American football from West Virginia
American football safeties
California Vulcans football players
Fairmont State Fighting Falcons football players
Indianapolis Colts players
New England Patriots players
Oakland Raiders players
Seattle Seahawks players